Billy Rankin may refer to:

Billy Rankin (drummer) English drummer of the 1960s and 1970s, noted for his work with Brinsley Schwarz and others
Billy Rankin (guitarist) (born 1959), Scottish guitarist noted for his work with the band Nazareth